A floatplane is a type of seaplane with one or more slender floats mounted under the fuselage to provide buoyancy. By contrast, a flying boat uses its fuselage for buoyancy. Either type of seaplane may also have landing gear suitable for land, making the vehicle an amphibious aircraft. British usage is to call "floatplanes" "seaplanes" rather than use the term "seaplane" to refer to both floatplanes and flying boats.

Use

Since World War II and the advent of helicopters, advanced aircraft carriers and land-based aircraft, military seaplanes have stopped being used. This, coupled with the increased availability of civilian airstrips, have greatly reduced the number of flying boats being built. However, numerous modern civilian aircraft have floatplane variants, most of these are offered as third-party modifications under a supplemental type certificate (STC), although there are several aircraft manufacturers that build floatplanes from scratch. These floatplanes have found their niche as one type of bush plane, for light duty transportation to lakes and other remote areas, as well as to small/hilly islands without proper airstrips. They may operate on a charter basis (including pleasure flights), provide scheduled service, or be operated by residents of the area for private, personal use.

Design

Float planes have often been derived from land-based aircraft, with fixed floats mounted under the fuselage instead of retractable undercarriage (featuring wheels).

Float planes offer several advantages since the fuselage is not in contact with water, which simplifies production by not having to incorporate the compromises necessary for water tightness, general impact strength and the hydroplaning characteristics needed for the aircraft to leave the water. Attaching floats to a landplane also allows for much larger production volumes to pay for the development and production of the small number of aircraft operated from the water. Additionally, on all but the largest seaplanes, floatplane wings usually offer more clearance over obstacles, such as docks, reducing the difficulty in loading while on the water. A typical single engine flying boat is unable to bring the hull alongside a dock for loading while most floatplanes are able to do so.

Floats inevitably impose extra drag and weight, rendering floatplanes slower and less manoeuvrable during flight, with a slower rate of climb, relative to aircraft equipped with wheeled landing gear. Nevertheless, air races devoted to floatplanes attracted much attention during the 1920s and 1930s, most notably in the form of the Schneider Trophy, not least because water takeoffs permitted longer takeoff runs which allowed greater optimization for high speed compared to contemporary airfields.

There are two basic configurations for the floats on floatplanes: 
 "single float" designs, in which a single large float is mounted directly underneath the fuselage, with smaller stabilizing floats underneath the wingtips, on planes like the Nakajima A6M2-N and;
 "twin float" designs, with two main floats mounted side by side outboard of the fuselage. Some early twin float designs had additional wingtip stabilizing floats.

The main advantage of the single float design is its capability for landings in rough water: a long central float is directly attached to the fuselage, this being the strongest part of the aircraft structure, while the smaller floats under the outer wings provide the aircraft with lateral stability. By comparison, dual floats restrict handling, often to waves as little as one foot (0.3 metres) in height. However, twin float designs facilitate mooring and boarding, and – in the case of torpedo bombers – leave the belly free to carry a torpedo.

See also
 List of flying boats and floatplanes
 RAPT system

References

External links

 "Why Seaplanes Fly With Bullet Speed", December 1931, Popular Science excellent article on the different design features of the floats on floatplanes
 "Will a Lake Be Your Postwar Landing Field?" Popular Science, February 1945, pp. 134–135.